The Critics' Choice Television Award for Best Talk Show is one of the award categories presented annually by the Critics' Choice Television Awards (BTJA). It was introduced in 2011 when the event was first initiated. The winners are selected by a group of television critics that are part of the Broadcast Television Critics Association.

Winners and nominees

2010s

2020s

Multiple wins
3 wins
 The Daily Show with Jon Stewart
 Last Week Tonight with John Oliver

2 wins
 The Late Late Show with James Corden
 Late Night with Seth Meyers (consecutive)

Multiple nominations
8 nominations
 Jimmy Kimmel Live!

6 nominations
 The Daily Show with Jon Stewart
 Last Week Tonight with John Oliver

5 nominations
 The Late Late Show with James Corden
 The Tonight Show Starring Jimmy Fallon

4 nominations
 The Ellen DeGeneres Show
 Full Frontal with Samantha Bee
 The Kelly Clarkson Show
 Late Night with Seth Meyers

3 nominations
 Conan
 Desus & Mero
 Watch What Happens Live with Andy Cohen

2 nominations
 The Amber Ruffin Show
 The Graham Norton Show
 Late Night with Jimmy Fallon

See also
 Primetime Emmy Award for Outstanding Variety Series
 Primetime Emmy Award for Outstanding Variety Talk Series
 Daytime Emmy Award for Outstanding Talk Show Informative
 Daytime Emmy Award for Outstanding Talk Show Entertainment

References

External links
 

Critics' Choice Television Awards